The Seventy-sixth session of the United Nations General Assembly was the session of the United Nations General Assembly which ran from 14 September 2021 to 13 September 2022. The President of the UN General Assembly is from Asia-Pacific Group.

Organisation for the session

President 
On 7 June 2021, Maldivian politician and diplomat, and current Minister of Foreign Affairs, Abdulla Shahid was elected to the position of President of the General Assembly.

In his vision statement, Shahid laid out some of his priorities for the session. Specifically, a stronger and more effective United Nations to inspire unity and solidarity, and above all hope. His "Five Rays of Hope” include recovering from COVID-19, rebuilding sustainably, responding to the needs of the planet, respecting the rights of all and revitalising the united nations. He also pledged that his team would be gender balanced, multi-national and geographical diverse. Finally he pledged to uphold the rules of procedure of the General Assembly for him, his team and the entire Assembly.

Vice-Presidents 
The General Assembly elected the following countries as the vice-presidents of the 76th session:

The five permanent members of the Security Council:

 
 
 
 
 

As well as the following nations:

 
 
 
 
 
 

 
 
 
 
 
 

 
 
 Vacant, Latin American and Caribbean Group
 Vacant, Latin American and Caribbean Group

Committees 
The following were elected Chairs and Officers of the General Assembly's Main Committees for the 76th Session:

Seat allocation 
As is tradition before each session of the General Assembly, the Secretary-General drew lots to see which member state would occupy the first seat in the General Assembly Chamber, with the other member states following according to the English translation of their name. For the 76th Session, Suriname was selected to sit in the first seat by Secretary-General António Guterres. This same order is followed in the six main committees, as well as other United Nations bodies.

Agenda 
The agenda for the 76th session, will be approved by the General Committee prior to the opening of the Session.

General debate 

Each member of the General Assembly will have a representative speaking about issues concerning their country and the hopes for the coming year as to what the UNGA will do. This is an opportunity for the member states to opine on international issues of their concern.

The order of speakers is given first to member states, then observer states and supranational bodies. Any other observers entities will have a chance to speak at the end of the debate, if they so choose. Speakers will be put on the list in the order of their request, with special consideration for ministers and other government officials of similar or higher rank. According to the rules in place for the General Debate, the statements should be in of the United Nations official languages of Arabic, Chinese, English, French, Russian or Spanish, and will be translated by the United Nations translators. Each speaker is requested to provide 350 advance copies of their statements to the conference officers to facilitate translation and to be presented at the podium.

References 

United Nations General Assembly
Sessions of the United Nations General Assembly